The Corinthia Group is the parent company to Corinthia Hotels International.  The group is an international investor, developer, and operator of upscale hotels and resorts in Europe and Africa.

History 

The Corinthia Group's success begins with prominent hotelier Alfred Pisani, who developed one of Malta's first deluxe hotels on a family-owned estate.  The original Corinthia Palace Hotel was opened in Malta in 1968 by the Duke of Edinburgh.  Pisani, as current chairman and chief executive officer, has since expanded the company into a multinational competitive group comprising four subsidiary companies.

Hotel management 

Corinthia Hotels International Limited is a multi-brand hotel operator, having exclusive management licenses to operate hotels under the Corinthia Brand. The exclusive licenses extend to Europe, Africa, and the Middle East. The Pisani family through its stake in IHI owns 100% of the company.  CHI manages hotels in the United Kingdom, Czech Republic, Hungary, Libya, Malta, Portugal, Russia, The Gambia, Togo, Tunisia, and Turkey.

Project management 

QPM Limited dates back to the 1980s and since then has developed into the largest international project management organisation in Malta, having been entrusted with more than forty projects valued at over €600 million.

Industrial catering 

Corinthia In-flight Services was established in 1974 and currently has a production capacity in excess of a million meals annually. It caters to international airlines operating in and out of Europe such as Lufthansa, British Airways, SAS, and Emirates Airlines, as well as the catering for many VIP flights.  CIS is also a member of the International Travel Catering Association.

Hotel investments 

International Hotel Investments (IHI) was set up and promoted by the Corinthia Group, a long-standing investor, developer, and operator of upscale hotels in Europe, Africa, and the Mediterranean region. Following a successful IPO in April 2000, the company's shares were listed on the Malta Stock Exchange and are soon to be listed on a major stock exchange in Europe.  Target acquisitions have typically involved hotels that are, or have the potential to become, the top five-star properties in their respective locations.

References

External links
Corinthia Group of Companies
Corinthia Hotels International
Corinthia Construction and Management

Hospitality companies of Malta
Hotels in Malta
Conglomerate companies established in 1960
1960 establishments in Malta